Beltone Studios was a recording studio at 1650 Broadway, Manhattan, New York City. Miles Davis's album Miles Davis and Horns was partly recorded here in 1953, and  The Crows  1954 hit "Gee" was also recorded here, the same year. In 1960, it established Beltone Records.

References

Recording studios in Manhattan
Broadway (Manhattan)